Khaneqah-e Sofla (also Romanized as Khāneqāh-e Soflá; also known as Khāneqāh Ojāq and Khāngāh Ojāq) is a village in Mulan Rural District, in the Central District of Kaleybar County, East Azerbaijan Province, Iran. At the 2006 census, its population was 77, in 12 families.

References 

Populated places in Kaleybar County